Perrottetia dermapyrrhosa is a species of air-breathing land snail, a terrestrial pulmonate gastropod mollusk in the family Streptaxidae.

The specific name dermapyrrhosa is from the Greek “derma” meaning “skin” and “pyrrhos” meaning “red or yellowish-red”.

Distribution

Distribution of Perrottetia dermapyrrhosa include Thailand. It is known from the type locality only. The type locality is Wat Tam Namsrithong, Nong Kung Si District, Kalasin Province, Thailand, .

Description
This species was described from Thailand in 2013 with a complete information on shell, radula and genitalia. Live specimens exhibit yellowish-red reticulated skin, and reddish tentacular retractor muscles are visible through the semi-transparent body.

The shell has 6–6½ whorls. The width of the shell is 7.4–8.1 mm. The height of the shell is 5.4–6.6 mm.

Digestive system: Teeth of the radula are arranged in anteriorly V-shaped rows.

Reproductive system of Perrottetia dermapyrrhosa was described by Siriboon et al. in detail in 2013.

Ecology
It lives in an isolated limestone hill reaching about 300 meters above mean sea level, and which is surrounded by the Korat Plateau.

Species in the genus Perrottetia are carnivorous.

References
This article includes CC-BY-3.0 text from the reference

External links

Streptaxidae
Gastropods described in 2013